Eunidia tubericollis is a species of beetle in the family Cerambycidae. It was described by Stephan von Breuning in 1961. It is known from Tanzania, Namibia, Zambia, South Africa, the Democratic Republic of the Congo, and Zimbabwe.

References

Eunidiini
Beetles described in 1961